Hemantha is a Sinhalese masculine name. Notable people with the name include:

Hemantha Boteju (born 1977), Sri Lankan cricketer
Hemantha Devapriya (born 1958), Sri Lankan cricketer
Hemantha Jayasena (born 1971), Sri Lankan cricketer
Hemantha Wickramaratne (born 1971), Sri Lankan cricketer
Mahesh Hemantha, Sri Lankan cricketer

See also
Hemant, an Indian male given name, including a list of people with the name. 
Hemanta, a variation of the name Hemant, including a list of people with the name.
Hemanth, a variation of the name Hemant, including a list of people with the name.

Sinhalese masculine given names